"Spotted Horses" is a novella written by William Faulkner and originally published in Scribner's magazine in 1931. It includes the character Flem Snopes, who appears in much of Faulkner's work, and tells in ambiguous terms of his backhand profiteering with an honest Texan selling untamed ponies. "Spotted Horses" was later incorporated into The Hamlet (the first book of the Snopes trilogy) under the title "The Peasants: Chapter One". 

It features Vladimir Kyrlytch Ratliff who appears in other Faulkner short stories and is a prominent character in The Hamlet, The Town and The Mansion.

A descendant of these horses is purchased by Jewel, the illegitimate middle son of Addie Bundren, in the novel As I Lay Dying (1930).

External links
"Spotted Horses" at Digital Yoknapatawpha

1931 short stories
Short stories by William Faulkner
Works originally published in Scribner's Magazine